Lucapinella is a genus of sea snails, marine gastropod mollusks in the family Fissurellidae, the keyhole limpets.

Species
Species within the genus Lucapinella include:
Lucapinella aequalis (Sowerby, 1835)
Lucapinella callomarginata (Dall, 1871)
Lucapinella crenifera (Sowerby, 1835)
Lucapinella delicata Nowell-Usticke, 1969
Lucapinella elenorae McLean, 1967
Lucapinella henseli (Martens, 1900)
Lucapinella limatula (Reeve, 1850)
Lucapinella milleri Berry, 1959
Lucapinella versluysi Dautzenberg, 1900
Species brought into synonymy
Lucapinella callomarginata auct. non Dall, 1872: synonym of Lucapinella delicata Usticke, 1969
Lucapinella hassleri Pérez Farfante, 1943: synonym of Lucapinella henseli (Martens, 1900)
Lucapinella talanteia Olsson & Harbison, 1953: synonym of  Lucapinella limatula (Reeve, 1850)

References

 McLean J.H. (1967) West American species of Lucapinella. The Veliger 9(3): 349-352.
 Rolán E., 2005. Malacological Fauna From The Cape Verde Archipelago. Part 1, Polyplacophora and Gastropoda.

Fissurellidae
Gastropod genera